Roberta Corti, better known by her stage name Betty Curtis (21 March 1936 – 15 June 2006), was an Italian singer active from 1957 to 2004.

Curtis grew up in the Zone 8 of Milan's borough Cagnola. She started singing in night clubs at an early age and was discovered by Teddy Reno in 1958. Her debut single was a rendition of With All My Heart performed with the Franco Pisano Orchestra.

Curtis' song "Al di là", performed together with Luciano Tajoli, won the Sanremo Music Festival in 1961. Betty Curtis represented Italy in the Eurovision Song Contest in 1961 with her San Remo winning song, which tied for fifth in Cannes.

In 1965 she returned to Sanremo with "Invece no".

Curtis's version of "Chariot" (I Will Follow Him) was used in the soundtrack of Martin Scorsese's film Goodfellas (1990).

Albums
1959 Lontano da te... lontano dal mare (CGD, FGS 5001)
1965 Betty (CGD, FGS 5015)
1970 A modo mio (CGD, FGS 5075)
1975 Folk(Alpharecord, AR 3017)
1975 Ricordiamole insieme (Alpharecord, AR 3018)
1976 Folk n.2 (Alpharecord)

Singles
1958 "Con tutto il cuore" (With All My Heart)
1958 "La pioggia cadrà"
1959 "Nessuno"
1959 "Una marcia in fa" (with Johnny Dorelli)
1959 "Buondì" (Alone)
1960 "Non sei felice"
1960 "Il mio uomo"
1961 "Al di là"
1961 "Pollo e champagne"
1961 "Aiutami a piangere"
1961 "Midi Midinette"
1961 "Ci vogliono i mariti"
1961 "Neve al chiaro di luna"
1962 "Buongiorno amore"
1962 "Stasera piove"
1962 "Soldi soldi soldi"
1962 "Tango del mare"
1962 "Chariot" (I Will Follow Him)
1963 "Wini, wini"
1964 "La casa più bella del mondo"
1964 "Scegli me o il resto del mondo"
1965 "Invece no" 
1966 "Le porte dell`amore"
1967 "È più forte di me"
1967 "Guantanamera"
1967 "Povero Enrico"
1969 "Gelosia"
1970 "Donna" 
1974 "Ma ci pensi tu (Cu Cu Ru Cu Cu Paloma)" 
1976 "La grulla" 
1976 "Innamorarsi No!"
1978 "Sarò la luce che ti guida" (Candle on the water)

References

1936 births
2006 deaths
Singers from Milan
Eurovision Song Contest entrants for Italy
Eurovision Song Contest entrants of 1961
Sanremo Music Festival winners
20th-century Italian women singers